= Frankfurter Maschinenbau-Aktiengesellschaft =

German vehicle manufacturer

- Formerly: Pokorny & Wittekind
- Company type: Corporation
- Industry: Machinery and automotive industry
- Founded: 1913; 113 years ago
- Defunct: 1971; 55 years ago
- Headquarters: Frankfurt, Hesse, Germany
- Products: commercial vehicles

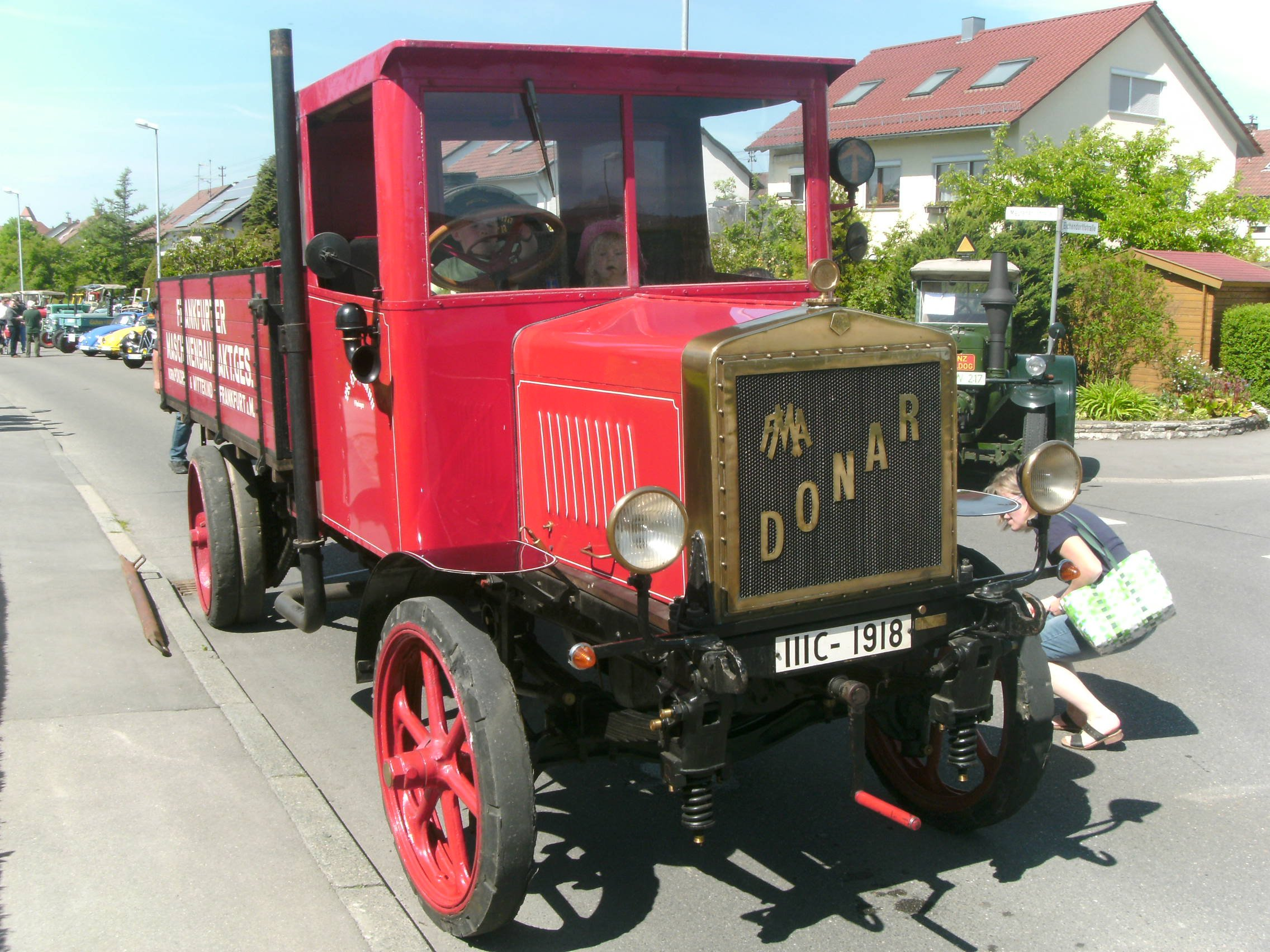
FMA Donar 4-5 t

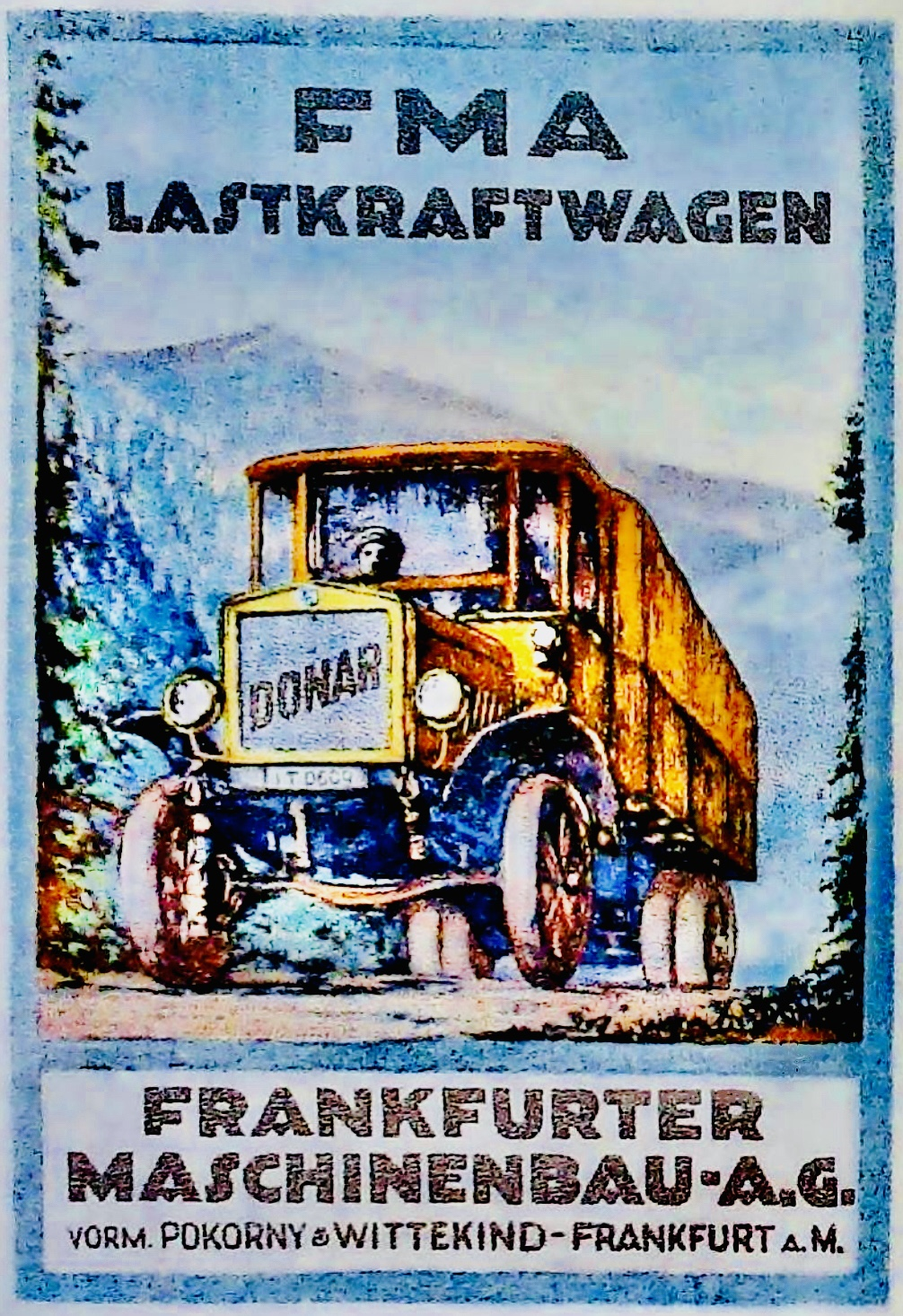
FMA „Donar“ (1924)

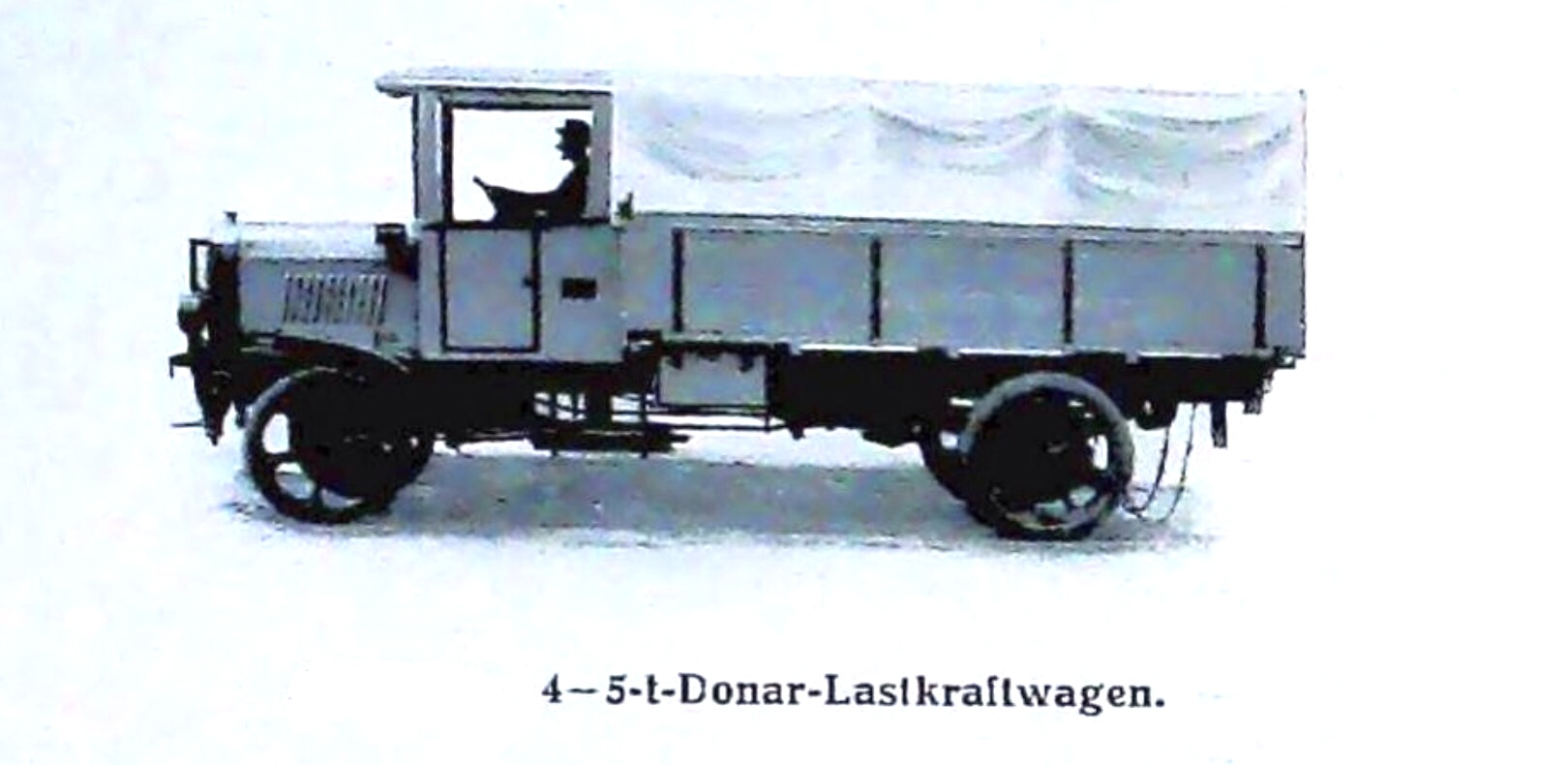
FMA 4-5 t (1924)

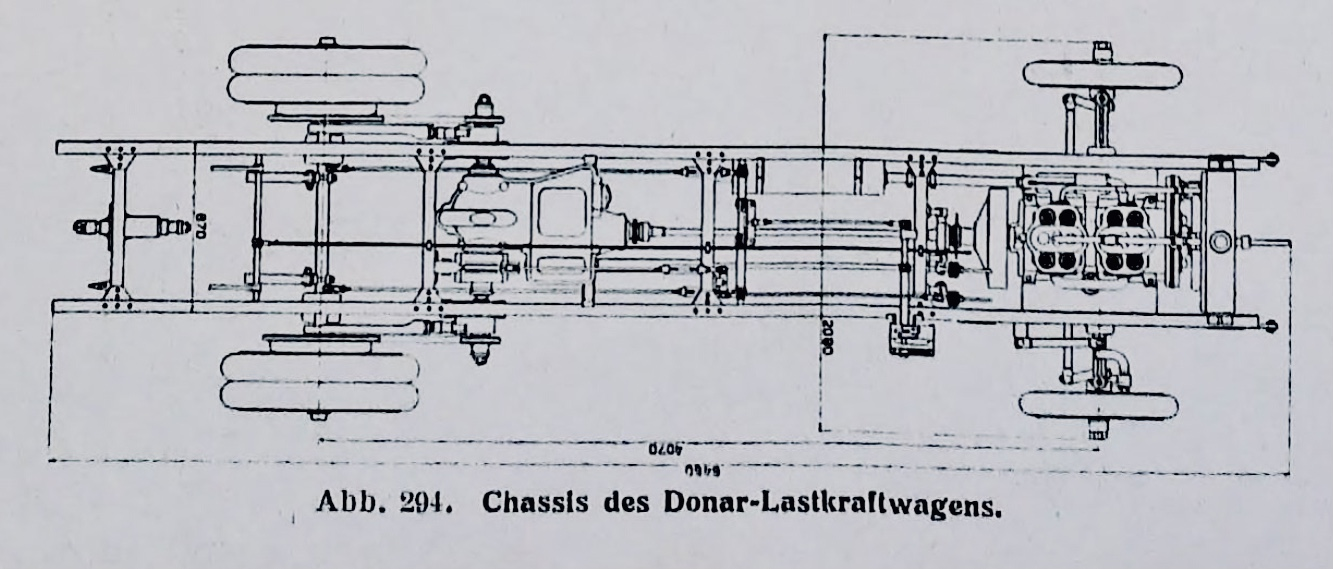
FMA Chassis „Donar“ (1924)

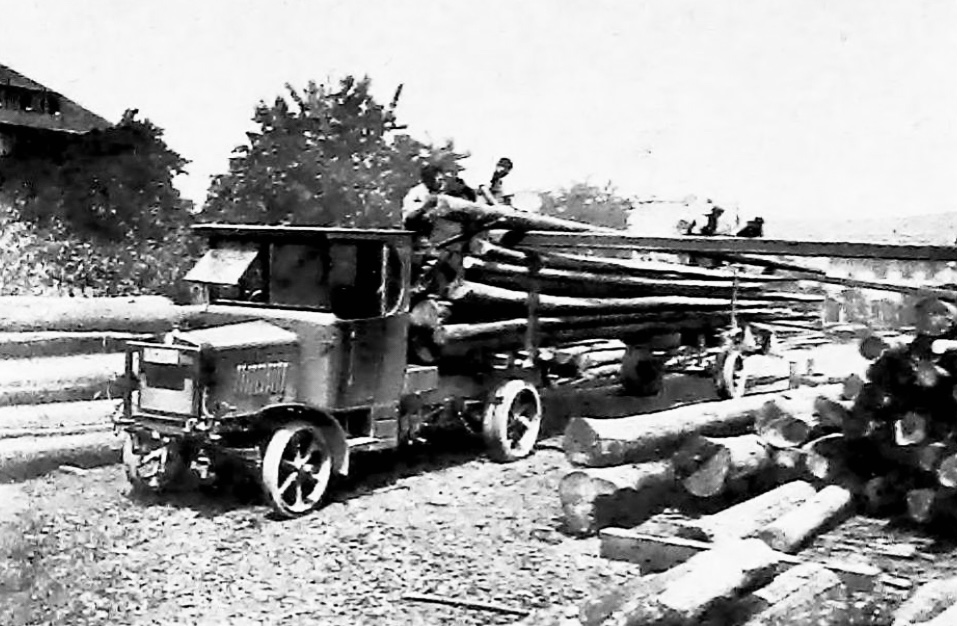
FMA lumber truck (1924)

Frankfurter Maschinenbau-Aktiengesellschaft was a manufacturer of commercial vehicles and buses headquartered in Frankfurt, Germany with customers mostly in Germany.

== History ==
The predecessor company was already founded in 1872 under the name "Gendebien & Naumann." When Messrs. Pokorny & Wittekind took over the company, the company name was changed to reflect the new owners. In 1913, Pokorny & Wittekind was renamed once again to Frankfurter Maschinenbau-Aktiengesellschaft. The company Frankfurter Maschinenbau AG., formerly Pokorny & Wittekind, Frankfurt/M., with its headquarters at Solmstraße 2, began production of a standard three-ton truck Type „Frankfurt“ in 1917. Department 4 (later Donar Plant) in Frankfurt-Bockenheim on Kreuznacher Straße 54–56 supplied the truck under the name “Frankfurt” to the army for use in the First World War. After the war, between 1921 and 1927, the company produced a new truck under the brand name "Donar" (Germanic god of thunder). The trucks with a payload of 2.5 to 5 tons, as well as buses, were equipped with an 8-liter four-cylinder gasoline engine manufactured in-house. The Donar engine in the 5-ton truck initially delivered 30/50 hp in the L Ia model, later 59/65 hp, while the Donar bus engine (for 30–40 passengers) even produced 65/70 hp.

== Products ==
- Type 'Frankfurt' 3 t
- Type 'Donar' 2.5 t
- Type 'Donar' 4-5 t
- Type 'Donar' Omnibus 30-40 seats

The displacement of the self-developed four-cylinder engine Donar was 7964 cc. The piston diameter was 130 mm and the stroke 150 mm. The wheelbase was 4070 mm and the vehicle width 2080 mm.
